The South American potato tuber moth, Andean potato tuber moth or tomato stemborer (Symmetrischema tangolias) is a moth of the family Gelechiidae. It is native to South America, but has become a pest worldwide. Records include North America, Australia and New Zealand.

The wingspan is about 20 mm.

The larvae are a pest on Solanum tuberosum. It attacks the tubers as well as the stems and leaves of the plant. Pupation takes place amongst the debris of the host plant.

References

External links
 Australian Insects
 Australian Faunal Directory

Symmetrischema
Moths of New Zealand
Moths described in 1913